Andrea Avraam (born 20 January 1963) is a Cypriot long-distance runner. She competed in the women's 3000 metres at the 1988 Summer Olympics.

References

1963 births
Living people
Athletes (track and field) at the 1988 Summer Olympics
Athletes (track and field) at the 1992 Summer Olympics
Cypriot female long-distance runners
Olympic athletes of Cyprus
Athletes (track and field) at the 1990 Commonwealth Games
Commonwealth Games competitors for Cyprus
World Athletics Championships athletes for Cyprus
Place of birth missing (living people)